Anke Domscheit-Berg (born Anke Domscheit; 17 February 1968) is a German politician and activist. She has been a member of the Bundestag since 2017, when she was elected on the party list of The Left, without being a party member. She joined the party in 2021 following her nomination to the top female position on the party election list in the state of Brandenburg. Previously, she was a member of the Pirate Party Germany and the Greens. She is married to Daniel Domscheit-Berg.

Life 
Anke Domscheit-Berg grew up as daughter of an art historian and a doctor in Müncheberg, East Germany. She has a sister and two brothers. Domscheit-Berg attended a polytechnic secondary school, before transferring to an extended secondary school in Strausberg to sit the  examination. In 1987 she began studying textile art in Schneeberg, Saxony. Following German reunification, she worked for three years to finance her further studies. In 1996 she gained a Bachelor of Arts - International Business Administration degree and in the same year completed a Master of Business Administration degree at Northumbria University.

After graduating she worked as a management consultant at Accenture and McKinsey. From 2008 to 2011, Domscheit-Berg was active as a lobbyist for Microsoft in Germany. Following that, she was self-employed as a writer and businesswoman. The company aims to promote the decentralised development of fibre-optic networks in Germany. In 2017, she stepped down from the position of managing director.

In 2010 she was an honorary supervisory board member of Teach First Deutschland. She was a freelance policy advisor at the World Future Council on the topic of violence against women and girls and an honorary member of the think-tank of the German NGO Welthungerhilfe.

From June–October 2017 she worked part-time as a research assistant to Petra Sitte, a member of the German Bundestag.

In 2000, Domscheit-Berg gave birth to a son. After separating from the father, she was a single mother for a while. In 2010 she married Daniel Berg. She lives in Fürstenberg/Havel.

Political career 
Anke Domscheit-Berg was a member of Alliance 90/The Greens in the Mitte borough of Berlin. In May 2012 she joined the Pirate Party Germany. From August 2013 to July 2014, Domscheit-Berg was chair of the Pirate Party in Brandenburg.

In the 2013 German federal election, Domscheit-Berg was second on the Pirates' party list in Brandenburg, and also stood as a direct candidate in the single-member constituency of Oberhavel – Havelland II. In the 2014 European Parliament election, she was third on the Pirate Party's national party list. She was however unsuccessful in both elections.

In September 2014, Domscheit-Berg left the Pirate Party. In the 2017 German federal election, she stood as a candidate for The Left in the constituency of Brandenburg an der Havel – Potsdam-Mittelmark I – Havelland III – Teltow-Fläming I, without being a party member, as well as taking third place on the party list of The Left in Brandenburg. She was defeated in the constituency by CDU candidate Dietlind Tiemann, but was elected as a member of the Bundestag via the party list. She is the chair of the Left group in the Bundestag's 'Digital Agenda' committee.

Bibliography 
  (Break down walls! Because I believe we can change the world.) Heyne Verlag, Munich 2014, 
  (Some equality is not enough! Why we are still a long way from gender equality. A wake-up call.) Heyne Verlag, Munich 2015,

References

External links
 

1968 births
Living people
Female members of the Bundestag
Members of the Bundestag 2021–2025
Members of the Bundestag 2017–2021
Members of the Bundestag for The Left
Members of the Bundestag for Brandenburg
21st-century German women politicians